Alief Hastings High School is a public high school in the Alief area of Houston, Texas, United States. Originally  Alief Junior-Senior High School, which became Alief Middle School, housed all of the secondary students in the district. The school's present location opened, while still under construction, for the fall semester of 1972.  All high school students moved to that building, with the first graduating class in May 1973.

Alief Hastings is a part of the Alief Independent School District and it serves grades 9 through 12. Ninth-graders are in the Alief Hastings Ninth Grade Center (6750 Cook Road, City of Houston, 77072) while tenth through twelfth graders are on the main campus (4410 Cook Road, City of Houston, 77072). The campuses had a combined enrollment of 4207 students as of the 2002-2003 school year. The opening of Alief Taylor High School reduced the overall class size at Alief Hastings significantly. Alief Hastings is considered to be the brother school of Alief Elsik High School.

The ninth grade campus is located in the International District although the main high school building is outside of it.

In 2019, Hastings received a C grade from the Texas Education Agency.

Campus students

All Alief ISD elementary, intermediate, and middle schools feed into Hastings as high school placement in Alief ISD is determined by a computerized lottery: the lottery can result in either Elsik, Hastings, or Taylor. If a student was selected by lottery to attend a high school different from the high school of a relative currently attending or graduated from, the student may opt to transfer to that respective school.

Students may also complete an application for the district's magnet high school, Kerr.

Neighborhoods served by AISD include Alief, most of the New Chinatown, most of Westchase, Bellaire West, and most of Leawood.

Peggy Miller, a teacher, said that when she started being the school's yearbook advisor at Hastings, 18 years prior to 2008, the number of copies of yearbooks sold was 80% of the total number of students. Around 2008, the copies of yearbooks sold was 10-15% that of the total number of students. In 2008 Miller said "They all want them, but it's like, who's got $60? They would rather go buy their tennis shoes or buy a grill for their mouth or something. A book is not as significant today to a child." In 2008 Miller introduced color pages in an effort to entice students to buy more yearbooks.

Demographics
In the 2018-2019 school year, there were 3,998 students. 28.0% were African American, 11.0% were Asian, 57.2% were Hispanic, 0.3% were American Indian, 0.2% were Pacific Islander, 2.9% were White, and 0.5% were two or more races. 77.2% of students were Economically Disadvantaged, 23.8% were English Language Learners, and 6.1% received Special Education services.

Academics
For the 2018-2019 school year, the school received a C grade from the Texas Education Agency, with an overall score of 77 out of 100. The school received a C grade in two domains, Student Achievement (score of 77) and Closing the Gaps (score of 72), and a B grade in School Progress (score of 80). The school did not receive any of the seven possible distinction designations.

Notable alumni

 
 Ahmed Ali - a Sudanese professional sprinter who participated in the 2016 Summer Olympics in Rio de Janeiro, Brazil.
 Ronnie Amadi - CFL football player for the Calgary Stampeders.
 Mo Amer - stand-up comedian
 Donnie Avery - NFL football player for the Kansas City Chiefs.
 Jermall Charlo and Jermell Charlo - reigning world champion boxers aligned with Premier Boxing Champions
 Pat Combs - MLB Pitcher
 Shawn Dingilius-Wallace, who participated as a swimmer for Palau in the 2016 Summer Olympics in Rio de Janeiro, Brazil.
 Dean Hill - Professional Hockey Referee (WPHL, CHL, ECHL)
 Maxo Kream - Rapper
 Duy-Loan Le - Texas Instrument Senior Fellow
 Tembi Locke - actor, Sliders, Windfall
 Thien Thanh Thi Nguyen, better known by her current stage name Tila Tequila
 Sonal Shah - economist, part of Obama-Biden Transition Project
 Monique Truong - novelist, The Book of Salt
 Rodrique Wright - Canadian Football League football player for the Saskatchewan Roughriders.
 Richard Yoo - Entrepreneur, Former CEO and Founder of Rackspace, Former CEO and Founder of ServerBeach
 Troy Johnson - Former professional football player for the Chicago Bears
 Kyle Smith - Men's Basketball Coach, Washington State University<ref>[https://twitter.com/HastingsBB/status/1507044541563641869

References

External links

 

Alief Independent School District high schools
Educational institutions in the United States with year of establishment missing
Public high schools in Houston
School buildings completed in 1972
Educational institutions established in 1972
1972 establishments in Texas